The 20th Lambda Literary Awards were held in 2008, to honour works of LGBT literature published in 2007.

Special awards

Nominees and winners

External links
 20th Lambda Literary Awards

Lambda Literary Awards
Lambda
Lists of LGBT-related award winners and nominees
2008 in LGBT history
2008 awards in the United States